Kayak (styled as KAYAK) is a metasearch engine owned and operated by Booking Holdings.

Kayak's website and mobile apps are currently available in over 18 languages and more than 30 countries, including the United States, the United Kingdom, Canada, India, China, France, Germany, Italy, Spain, Russia, Switzerland, Norway, Sweden, Finland, the Netherlands, Australia, Ireland, Mexico, New Zealand, Belgium, Hong Kong, Taiwan, Korea, Japan, and Singapore.

History
Kayak was founded in January 2004 by Steve Hafner and Paul M. English. Before Kayak, Steve Hafner, Kayak's current CEO, helped found Orbitz in November 1999 and led its business development, advertising sales, marketing, and product marketing activities.

The company was originally named Travel Search Company, Inc. and the name was changed to Kayak Software Corporation in August 2004.

The website launched in February 2005.

In December 2007, Kayak raised $196 million in a new round of financing from a group of investors including General Catalyst, Sequoia Capital, Accel Partners, and Oak Investment Partners. Using that funding, Kayak acquired SideStep, another online travel agency.

On March 5, 2010, Kayak sold certain assets related to TravelPost.

In May 2010, Kayak acquired German travel search platform Swoodoo.

In January 2011, Kayak shut down SideStep and redirected SideStep traffic to Kayak.com.

In March 2011, Kayak began providing results in the U.S. version of Bing from multiple cities, airports and airlines in Bing's travel search section.

In April 2011, Kayak acquired all of the outstanding shares of JaBo Vertrieb-und Entwicklung GmbH, or JaBo Software, operator Checkfelix, a travel search engine in Austria.

On July 20, 2012, Kayak became a public company via an initial public offering. On its first day of trading, Kayak opened up at $26 per share and closed at $33.18 per share.

On May 21, 2013, Booking Holdings, then known as Priceline.com, acquired the company for $2.1 billion.

On September 25, 2013, it was announced that Connecticut would assist Kayak with a $2.5 million loan to help facilitate their move to the Harbor Point district of Stamford.

In August 2017, the company acquired Mundi.

In July 2018, Kayak assumed leadership of Hotels Combined, which was acquired by parent Booking Holdings.

In September 2018, the company launched a feature to help travelers determine if their luggage fits in the overhead bin of planes.

Awards
In 2013, Travel + Leisure named Kayak's app in its list of the Best Apps for Business Travelers as well as its list for the Best Apps and Websites for Travelers.

Time named Kayak to its list of the 50 Best Websites of 2009.

Mashable included Kayak in first place for the website's list, "10 Budget Airfare Tools Every Traveler Should Know in 2012".

Kayak won the following Webby Awards:
 2008: People's Voice award in the travel website category
 2009: The Webby Award in the travel website category
 2011: The People's Voice award in the mobile travel app category in 2011
 2012: 3 awards: both the Webby and People's Choice awards in the travel website category, and the People's Voice award in the mobile travel app category.
 2013: Nominee for Best Travel Mobile & App for Handheld Devices
 2014: both the People's Voice and Webby Award in the Travel category for Tablets.
 2015, Kayak Mobile won again the People's Voice Award in the Travel category.

The World Travel Awards presented Kayak with the World's Leading Flight Comparison Website award in 2013 and the World's Leading Travel Search Website award in 2011.

All-American Muslim advertising
In December 2011 Kayak announced that it would not renew a contract to advertise on the TLC reality television show All-American Muslim. The decision followed a campaign by the Florida Family Association, a one-man fundamentalist organization focused on “defending American values". In a statement posted to the Kayak website, Kayak chief marketing officer Robert Birge wrote that TLC “was not upfront with us about the nature of the show”.

References

External links
 

Booking Holdings
American travel websites
American companies established in 2004
Transport companies established in 2004
Internet properties established in 2004
2012 initial public offerings
2013 mergers and acquisitions
Webby Award winners
IOS software
Metasearch engines
Online travel agencies
Travel ticket search engines
Concord, Massachusetts
Companies formerly listed on the Nasdaq
Companies based in Stamford, Connecticut